Martin Heffernan (born 28 August 1972) is a former Australian rules footballer who played with Geelong and the Brisbane Bears in the Australian Football League (AFL).

Originally from Terang, Heffernan played his three games for Geelong midway through the 1992 AFL season. With Geelong going on to make the grand final, Heffernan was unable to break into the seniors on any more occasions.

He was selected by Brisbane in the 1993 Pre-Season Draft with pick six but would only add two further games to his league tally.

References

1972 births
Australian rules footballers from Victoria (Australia)
Geelong Football Club players
Brisbane Bears players
Terang Football Club players
Living people